Persicula chrysomelina is a species of sea snail, a marine gastropod mollusk, in the family Cystiscidae.

References

chrysomelina
Gastropods described in 1848
Cystiscidae